Roland Julien Clauws (6 December 1933 – 13 April 2004) was a French professional footballer who played as a midfielder.

Honours 
Lille

 Division 1: 1953–54
 Division 2: 1963–64
 Coupe de France: 1954–55
 Coupe Charles Drago runner-up: 1954, 1956

References 

1933 births
2004 deaths
Footballers from Lille
French footballers
Association football midfielders
Lille OSC players
RC Lens players
AC Cambrai players
Ligue 1 players
Ligue 2 players
Championnat de France Amateur (1935–1971) players